Rudolf Hajek is an Austrian para table tennis player. He represented Austria at the Summer Paralympics in 1988, 1992, 1996 and 2004. In total he won three gold medals and one silver medal.

At the 1996 Summer Paralympics held in Atlanta, Georgia, United States he won the silver medal in the men's team 1-2 event together with Gerhard Scharf.

References

External links 
 

Living people
Year of birth missing (living people)
Place of birth missing (living people)
Table tennis players at the 1988 Summer Paralympics
Table tennis players at the 1992 Summer Paralympics
Table tennis players at the 1996 Summer Paralympics
Table tennis players at the 2004 Summer Paralympics
Medalists at the 1996 Summer Paralympics
Paralympic gold medalists for Austria
Paralympic silver medalists for Austria
Paralympic table tennis players of Austria
Paralympic medalists in table tennis
Austrian male table tennis players
20th-century Austrian people
21st-century Austrian people